Bookanakere Siddalingappa Yediyurappa  (born 27 February 1943), often referred to by his initials BSY, is an Indian politician and statesman currently serving as a member of the Bharatiya Janata Party Parliamentary board committee since 17 August 2022, termed as the highest office of authority in the party. He served as the 13th Chief Minister of Karnataka, and currently a Member of the Karnataka Legislative Assembly. He is a member of the Bharatiya Janata Party. He is also the only politician so far in Karnataka to have served four times as Chief Minister and three times as Leader of the Opposition in the Karnataka Legislative Assembly. He is the longest serving Chief Minister of Karnataka from BJP. He is a MLA from Shikaripura constituency in Shimoga district, from where he has been elected eight times.

In 2008, Yediyurappa became the chief minister after leading BJP to a victory in the Karnataka Assembly elections, a first for the BJP in a South Indian state. In 2011, he resigned after being indicted over a corruption case; he was acquitted in 2016. Owing to alleged ill-treatment meted out to Yediyurappa by the BJP High Command, he left BJP and formed his own party, the Karnataka Janata Paksha. In 2014 he merged his party with the BJP and was subsequently elected to the 16th Lok Sabha from the Shivamogga constituency, which he quit after being elected to the Karnataka Legislative Assembly in May 2018 state elections. On 17 May 2018, he was sworn in as the chief minister, his third term in the office. Unable to get majority support in the Assembly, he resigned just two days after taking office, after which H. D. Kumaraswamy took oath as the chief minister. After the government of Kumaraswamy lost its majority in July 2019 with the resignation of 17 MLAs, Yediyurappa took oath as the chief minister and proved his majority. In the December by-elections, BJP won 12 seats out of 15 and gained a majority of 117 seats under his leadership, cementing his win.

After days of speculation, Yediyurappa resigned as Chief Minister on 26 July 2021, the second anniversary of his fourth term. He was succeeded by his protege, Basavaraj Bommai, on 28 July 2021.

Personal life
Yediyurappa was born on 27 February 1943 in a village called Bookanakere in Krishnarajpet taluk of Mandya district. His parents were Siddalingappa and Puttathayamma. He was named after the presiding deity of a Shaivite temple built by the great saint Siddalingeshwara at Yediyur in Tumkuru district. His mother died when he was four. He completed his Pre-University College education from Government college, Mandya (Mysore University) 1960–61. He belongs to Banajiga sub-cast of veerashaiva Lingayat community.

In 1965, he was appointed a first-division clerk in the social welfare department but he quit the job and moved on to Shikaripura where he joined as a clerk at Veerabhadra Shastri's Shankara rice mill. In 1967, Yediyurappa married Mythradevi, daughter of a rice mill owner. He later set up a hardware shop in Shimoga. Yediyurappa has two sons, Raghavendra, B. Y. Vijayendra and three daughters, Arunadevi, Padmavati and Umadevi. In 2004, his wife died after falling into a sump while drawing water. There was further tragedy when his granddaughter Soundarya, daughter of Padmavathi, died in January 2022 by hanging herself in Bangalore at the age of 30.

In 2007, he changed the spelling of his name to Yeddyurappa from the earlier Yediyurappa following the advice of his astrologers, to change back again to Yediyurappa before oath taking ceremony on 26 July 2019. He is a follower of Basavanna. In 2020 he was infected by the COVID-19 virus but recovered soon afterwards. On 16 April 2021, he again tested positive for COVID-19 amidst India's second wave of infections.

Political career

Having been associated with the Rashtriya Swayamsevak Sangh from his college days, Yediyurappa's public service began when he was appointed as Karyavaha (Secretary) of the Sangh's Shikaripur unit in 1970. In 1972, he was elected to the Shikaripura Town Municipality and was also appointed as the President of the Taluk unit of the Jana Sangh. In 1975, he was elected President of the Town Municipality of Shikaripura. He was imprisoned during the Emergency in India and lodged in the Bellary and Shimoga jails. In 1980, he was appointed President of the Shikaripura taluk unit of the BJP and later went on to become the president of BJP's Shimoga district unit in 1985. In 1988, he became the State President of the BJP in Karnataka. He was first elected to the lower house of the Karnataka Legislature in 1983 and has since represented the Shikaripura constituency six times. He has been a member of the Seventh, Eighth, Ninth, Tenth, Twelfth and Thirteenth Legislative Assemblies (lower house) of Karnataka. Following the 1994 state assembly elections, he became the Leader of Opposition in the Karnataka Legislative Assembly. In 1999, he lost the elections but was nominated by the BJP to become a member of the legislative council (upper house) of Karnataka. Again, he was re-elected in 2004 and became the Leader of Opposition in the Karnataka Legislative Assembly during the chief ministership of Dharam Singh.

His first stint in power when he helped Janata Dal (Secular) leader H. D. Kumaraswamy to bring down the coalition government headed by Dharam Singh and form an alternative government with BJP. An agreement was made between the JD(S) and BJP, which specified that H. D. Kumaraswamy would be the Chief Minister for the first 20 months, after which Yediyurappa would become the Chief Minister for the remaining 20 months. Yediyurappa became the Deputy Chief Minister as well as the finance minister in Kumaraswamy's Government.

However, in October 2007, when it was Yediyurappa's turn to become Chief Minister, Kumaraswamy refused to relinquish his post. This forced Yediyurappa and all the ministers from his party to resign and on 5 October, the BJP formally withdrew the support to the Kumaraswamy government. Karnataka came under President's rule which was revoked on 7 November as the JD(S) and the BJP decided to bury their differences and this paved the way for Yediyurappa to become the Chief Minister of Karnataka. Yediyurappa was sworn in as the 25th Chief Minister of Karnataka on 12 November 2007. However, JD(S) refused to support his government over disagreement on sharing of ministries which resulted in his resignation as Chief Minister on 19 November 2007.

In Karnataka's 2008 Assembly elections, Yediyurappa contested from Shikaripura against former Chief Minister S. Bangarappa of the Samajwadi Party. The Indian National Congress and JD(S) backed Bangarappa, but despite this, Yediyurappa won the seat by a margin of more than 45,000 votes. He also led the BJP to a historic victory in the state and Karnataka became the gateway for the BJP in south India. He took the oath of office as Chief Minister on 30 May 2008.

However, the Karnataka Lokayukta investigating the illegal mining case submitted its report indicting Yediyurappa for illegally profiteering from land deals in Bangalore and Shimoga, and also in connection with the illegal iron ore export scam in Bellary, Tumkur and Chitradurga districts of Karnataka. Following much pressure from the BJP central leadership, he announced his decision to quit.  Finally, he resigned on 31 July 2011. Ananth Kumar, Shobha Karandlaje, Jagadish Shettar, S Suresh Kumar were in the race to succeed him. But Sadananda Gowda replaced him as Chief minister.

He resigned from his position as Member of Legislative Assembly and primary membership of Bharatiya Janata Party on 30 November 2012, and formally launched the Karnataka Janata Paksha. It is told that his former colleague and senior BJP leader Anna Vinayachandra was the key person who led the movement at national level to demand expulsion from the party which led to his resignation. Although the party and its name were registered in April 2011, Yediyurappa actually launched it in 2012. He got elected as an MLA from Shikaripura Constituency (Shimoga district) in May 2013.

In November 2013, it was announced that he was considering an unconditional return to the BJP. On 2 January 2014 he announced merger with BJP ahead of 2014 Lok Sabha elections. He won from the Shimoga seat of Karnataka in the 2014 Indian general election by a margin of 363,305 votes.

In 2016, BJP re-appointed him as the President of Karnataka state BJP unit. He was BJP's CM candidate in 2018 Karnataka Legislative Assembly election. But the party managed to win only 104 seats, 9 short of simple majority.

During the aftermath of the 2018 Karnataka Legislative assembly elections, Yediyurappa was invited to form the government and become the Chief Minister by the Governor citing that his party was the single largest in the house with 104 seats (8 short of majority in the assembly). He was sworn in on 17 May 2018 by the Governor Vajubhai Vala, becoming the Chief minister of Karnataka for the third time. He was given 15 days to prove majority by the governor but the Supreme Court intervened and cut it short to just 24 hours and ordered a floor test (trust vote) soon after. The trust vote was to be held on 19 May 2018 at 4pm. Before the trust vote was to begin, however, Chief Minister B. S Yediyurappa gave an emotional speech, following which he resigned citing that he will be unable to prove majority. He thus became one of the shortest-serving chief minister in India with just  days in office.

Due to turmoil in the coalition government of JDS and Congress, 16 MLAS had submitted their resignation to government turning it to minority 2019 Karnataka resignation crisis. But out of 16, MLA Ramalinga Reddy was convinced to join back the fold. After 18 days of up and downs with rebel MLAs not withdrawing their demands and resignations, coalition government had to step down due to defeat of trust vote on 23 July 2019 hereby paving way to BJP and its leader Yediyurappa to stake claim for government formation. He was invited by Karnataka governor Vajubhai Vala on 26 July to form the new government, and took oath as the Chief Minister of the state for the fourth time.

The by-polls for these 15 out of the 17 constituencies were conducted on 5 December 2019, where all the parties campaigned immensely. B. S. Yediyurappa promised the voters that each candidate would be awarded a ministry if the people vote them. The results were declared on 9 December. BJP and its leader Yediyurappa were victorious by winning 12 out of the 15 contested seats, thereby a gaining a full majority, and a total of 117/224 assembly seats in the 2019 Karnataka Legislative Assembly by-elections.

Soon after he took oath as the chief minister, due to heavy rainfall the state was severely hit by floods. During the 2019 Karnataka floods, Karnataka received nearly five times the rainfall it normally used to have, adding to the severity of the ongoing floods in 12 districts that had killed 20 people by 9 August 2019. Thousands of people were evacuated to safer places and relief camps even though hundreds were displaced. Karnataka State Disaster Management Authority, Karnataka police along with the Indian Air Force, civilians, volunteers, fishermen from coastal Karnataka were actively taking part in the rescue operations in flood-affected regions. With the cabinet ministries yet to be formed, Yediyurappa alone as the chief minister visited the affected areas around the state. The Chief Minister Yediyurappa had announced a compensation of ₹5 lakh for the family members of those who died and lost houses in the floods. On 4 October 2019, Central Government had released an amount of 1200 Crores as Karnataka flood relief funds on the request of Yediyurappa.

In the early days of 2020, Yediyurappa visited Davos accompanying the Prime Minister Narendra Modi and attended the annual meet of World Economic Forum 2020. He along with the Industries Minister of the state Jagadish Shettar attracted investments for the Global Investors' Meet to be held in November in the IT-hub of Bangalore. Yediyurappa also led a delegation from Karnataka in the hope of attracting more investors to set up shop or expand their facilities in the state. The Chief Minister said that the state had received positive response from corporations such as French 3D design company Dassault Systems, aircraft maker Lockheed Martin, steelmaker ArcelorMittal, LuLu Group International and pharmaceutical major Novo Nordisk among others.

In December 2020, the Government of Karnataka, under his leadership passed the Anti Cow-Slaughter bill 2020, in aim to protect and nurture the cattle in the state, that were alleged being slaughtered illegally. The legislation empowered the police to inspect and seize vehicles that transport cattle and the premises where they are slaughtered. The new law brought stern punishment of imprisonment of up to 3 years and a penalty of 50,000 rupees. Amid opposition from the Congress members who staged a walk-out protest, the bill was passed unanimously in the floor of the house, and the law further came into effect in the state.

During the covid pandemic Karnataka became the first state to open a 10,000 bed Covid hospital and care centre in Bangalore. Yediyurappa after a cabinet meet concerning the COVID-19 pandemic announced that the Karnataka government would be providing 1 Lakh aid to BPL families who lost a working person in the first or second wave of the COVID-19 pandemic.

In July 2021, Yediyurappa assured the start of the Mekedatu project across river Kaveri, after the clearance of the obligations in the judicial courts. Even though he wrote a letter to the Tamil Nadu Chief Minister M. K. Stalin mentioning the project and to further cooperate in its smooth movement, Stalin opposed the start of the project stating concerned issues of his state. Later Yediyurappa still reassured that no odds can put a halt to the project, stating "Got Every Right To Start Dam Project Across River Cauvery". This led to further disputes between the two neighbouring states based on this issue, and also led to mutual protests against each other. The chief minister primarily met the Jalshakti Minister Gajendra Singh Shekhawat and also flew to New Delhi to meet Narendra Modi and clarify the process of the Mekedatu dam programme.

Under his tenure, Karnataka became the first state in India to provide reservations for transgender communities in all government services. In the final notification issued on 6 July, the government decided to provide 1 percent horizontal reservation to Transgender candidates in government jobs and this is to be filled through the direct recruitment under the (General Recruitment) Rule, 1977 to all sectors of social classes.

With speculations of leadership change in BJP Karnataka for over several months, rumours spread that Yediyurappa would be sacked and a new chief minister would be appointed for the state. Major leaders of the BJP reiterated that the change in leadership will be witnessed soon in the state. This also lead to various pro and con discussions among BJP. Various leaders, including leaders from opposition Congress party extended their support widely to Yediyurappa, encouraging him and his leadership for the party. Central leader Subramanyan Swamy also opposed any decisions of changing the post of BSY. With the news widespread, various influential seers and monks belonging to the majority Lingayat community and others swarmed in large numbers backing Yediyurappa, urging BJP to let BSY complete his term and warned about fierce protest if at all he was changed. Amid these doubts on 25 July the BJP national president J. P. Nadda slashed out these notions by stating "No crisis in Karnataka, Yediyurappa has done good work".

Later on 26 July 2021, he announced his resignation to the post of Chief Minister during his speech in the two years anniversary of his government. He cited the 75 years age-limit rule in BJP. During the speech he went through his memories of the 45 year political career, thanked his party leaders and high command, and submitted his resignation that afternoon, to the Governor of Karnataka.

A year later in July 2022, Yediyurappa announced retirement from electoral politics and stated that he will be vacating Shikaripura Assembly constituency in the 2023 Karnataka Legislative Assembly election. He further insisted that his son B. Y. Vijayendra would be contesting for the upcoming legislative elections from the same constituency in Shimoga.

In August 2022, Yediyurappa was elevated to the Central Parliamentary board, of the BJP. He was one of the member of the 11 board committee, which included Nadda, Narendra Modi, Amit Shah and other prominent members. Yediyurappa stated that he was humbled and would work hard in bringing the party to power in the southern states of India.

In February 2023, Yediyurappa made his farewell speech at the Karnataka Legislative assembly as an MLA, and reiterated that he would not be contesting in the upcoming elections in 2023, paving way for others but would work hard to bring the party back to power. Prime Minister Modi tweeted about the same stating it as an "inspiring speech to him and every worker of the party". 

Further on 27 February 2023, Narendra Modi greeted and wished Yediyurappa on his 80th birthday, heaped praise about his achievements and also inaugurated the long demanded Shivamogga airport in his presence.

Legal issues

Court cases and subsequent imprisonment 

In five cases issued in 2011, Yediyurappa was alleged to be responsible for illegal de-notification of land. He was jailed during this term and was convicted of corruption. The Karnataka High-court in 2015 set aside this order, thereby quashing the cases against him. After the high court quashed former governor H. R. Bhardwaj's sanction to prosecute Yediyurappa, a special Lokayukta court struck down four other FIRs against him. In a major relief to Yediyurappa and BJP, Karnataka High Court had set aside the sanction given by then-Governor HR Bhardwaj for his prosecution in several cases of alleged illegal de-notification of land, and asked the incumbent Vajubhai Vala to have a fresh look at it.

The High Court said, "non-consideration of the relevant matters made the order of sanction illegal and resulted in the failure of justice. We are thus of the opinion that the exercise of the power by the Governor was not in accordance with well-settled principles for sanctioning prosecution. We accordingly set aside the order of sanction, dated 21 January 2011, and remit the matter back to the Governor for reconsideration in the light of our discussions above."

Yediyurappa was arrested on the evening of 15 October 2011, hours after the Lokayukta court issued an arrest warrant in two cases of corruption for illegally denotifying land in and around Bangalore. Later, he was granted bail on 8 November 2011 after spending 23 days in jail.

However, in March 2012, the High Court of Karnataka quashed the FIR registered against him regarding the Mining. A division bench of the high court of Karnataka passed the order stating that "Suspicion cannot be a ground to tarnish the image and reputation of a person who is holding a Constitutional post. Even during the course of argument, a specific question was put to Lokayukta counsel to produce any material to connect the petitioner for alleged offences, but he was mum and did not indicate any favours shown by Yediyurappa as the chief minister to any mining company". In May 2012, the Supreme Court, temporarily stayed the case on this matter and ordered an official CBI enquiry, to be completed within three months. On 25 July 2012, Karnataka High Court granted anticipatory bail to Yediyurappa in a case relating to alleged irregularities in denotification of government land in 2009.

Other cases rejected by the Court were:
 Justice K N Keshavanarayana of High Court quashed the complaint alleging encroachment of land in Bhadra Reserve Forest by Yediyurappa and others on 5 February 2013
 Karnataka High Court quashed a case registered against him for irregularities in the Upper Bhadra irrigation project on 10 October 2013

Operation Kamala
"Operation Kamala" is a term coined in 2008, when former minister G. Janardhana Reddy used a method to secure support from legislators bypassing the Anti-Defection Law, so as to take BJP past the majority number. In 2018, H. D. Kumaraswamy alleged that the BJP used Operation Kamala to affect the defections of MLAs from his government, causing it to fall.

In an interview with Deccan Herald in March 2019, Yediyurappa said "Operation Kamala was not wrong and I don't regret it. It is part of democracy."

References

External links

Yeddyurappa's personal Website

Chief Ministers of Karnataka
Indian Hindus
Lingayatism
Kannada people
Living people
People from Mandya
1944 births
Chief ministers from Bharatiya Janata Party
India MPs 2014–2019
Lok Sabha members from Karnataka
Leaders of the Opposition in the Karnataka Legislative Assembly
Deputy Chief Ministers of Karnataka
Bharatiya Janata Party politicians from Karnataka
Karnataka Janata Paksha politicians
Karnataka MLAs 1983–1985
Karnataka MLAs 1985–1989
Karnataka MLAs 1989–1994
Karnataka MLAs 1994–1999
Karnataka MLAs 2004–2007
Karnataka MLAs 2008–2013
Karnataka MLAs 2018–2023
Indians imprisoned during the Emergency (India)